The 2009 WGC-HSBC Champions was a golf tournament that was contested from 5–8 November 2009 at the Sheshan Golf Club in Shanghai, China. It was the first WGC-HSBC Champions tournament, and the fourth of four World Golf Championships events held in 2009.

Phil Mickelson won the tournament, and claimed his second World Golf Championships title of the year and for his career. He won over Ernie Els by one stroke, and Mickelson shot a 17-under-par 271.

Field
The following is a list of players for the 2009 WGC-HSBC Champions tournament. Winners of events are those between the 2008 HSBC Champions and the 2009 WGC-HSBC Champions. The 2008 HSBC-Champions was considered to be an Asian Tour event. However, in determining which were the top rated events, the strength of field for the previous year's event was used (i.e. the event between the 2007 and 2008 HSBC-Champions). Only those events with a strength of field of 40 or more were considered.

1. Winners of the four major championships and The Players Championship
Stewart Cink, Henrik Stenson, Yang Yong-eun (3)
Qualified but did not play: Ángel Cabrera, Lucas Glover

2. Winners of the three World Golf Championships
Phil Mickelson (3), Geoff Ogilvy (3,10), Tiger Woods (3)

3. Winners of the 23 top rated PGA Tour events
Paul Casey (5), Brian Gay, Retief Goosen, Jerry Kelly, Sean O'Hair, Rory Sabbatini, Nick Watney
Qualified but did not play: Dustin Johnson, Zach Johnson, Kenny Perry, Heath Slocum, Steve Stricker

4. Top 5 available players from the FedEx Cup points list
Jason Dufner, Ernie Els, Pádraig Harrington, Steve Marino, Ian Poulter
Qualified but did not play: Luke Donald, Jim Furyk, Marc Leishman, Hunter Mahan, Kevin Na, John Senden, David Toms, Scott Verplank, Mike Weir

5. Winners of the 23 top rated European Tour events
Christian Cévaër, Nick Dougherty, Simon Dyson, Ross Fisher, Ricardo González, Peter Hedblom, Jeppe Huldahl, Michael Jonzon, Martin Kaymer, James Kingston, Søren Kjeldsen, Thomas Levet, Shane Lowry, Rory McIlroy, Alex Norén, Álvaro Quirós, Scott Strange (10), Daniel Vancsik, Lee Westwood

6. Top 5 available players from the Race to Dubai
Gonzalo Fernández-Castaño, Sergio García (7), Peter Hanson, Francesco Molinari, Oliver Wilson

7. Nine players - winners of the top rated Asian Tour events, remainder from Order of Merit
Gaganjeet Bhullar (OoM), Chapchai Nirat (OoM), Anthony Kang, Lin Wen-tang, Lam Chih Bing, Daisuke Maruyama (OoM, 8), Chinnaswamy Muniyappa (OoM), Jyoti Randhawa (OoM), Thongchai Jaidee

8. Five players - winners of the top rated Japan Golf Tour events, remainder from Order of Merit
Yuta Ikeda (OoM), Ryo Ishikawa, Shingo Katayama, Prayad Marksaeng, Jeev Milkha Singh

9. Five players - winners of the top rated Sunshine Tour events, remainder from Order of Merit
Thomas Aiken (OoM), Jean Hugo (OoM), Garth Mulroy (OoM), Mark Murless (OoM), Richard Sterne

10. Five players - winners of the top rated PGA Tour of Australasia events, remainder from Order of Merit
Robert Allenby (OoM), Mark Brown (OoM), Greg Chalmers (OoM), Danny Lee, Rod Pampling
Qualified but did not play: Tim Clark

11. Four players from China
Liang Wenchong, Wu Ashun, Wu Weihuang, Zhang Lianwei

12. Top two available players, not otherwise exempt, from the Official World Golf Ranking as of October 26, 2009
Anthony Kim, Camilo Villegas
Qualified but did not play: Vijay Singh

13. If needed to fill the field of 78 players, winners of additional tournaments, ordered by strength of field
Players in bold were added to the field through this category. Players listed in "()" already qualified in a previous category. Players listed with their name stricken did not play.
2009 Bob Hope Classic: Pat Perez
2009 Buick Open: (Tiger Woods)
2009 Justin Timberlake Shriners Hospitals for Children Open: Martin Laird
2008 Children's Miracle Network Classic: Davis Love III
2009 John Deere Classic: (Steve Stricker)
2009 Wyndham Championship: Ryan Moore
2009 RBC Canadian Open: Nathan Green
2009 Frys.com Open: Troy Matteson
2009 Valero Texas Open: (Zach Johnson)
2009 Turning Stone Resort Championship: Matt Kuchar
2008 Casio World Open: Koumei Oda

Round summaries

First round

Second round

Third round

Final round

References

External links
Full results

WGC-HSBC Champions
WGC-HSBC Champions
WGC-HSBC Champions
WGC-HSBC Champions